Hardwood timber production is the process of managing stands of deciduous trees to maximize woody output. The production process is not linear because other factors must be considered, including marketable and non-marketable goods, financial benefits, management practices, and the environmental implications, of those management practices.

Forests include market and non-market products.  Marketable products include goods that have a market price. Timber is the main one, with prices that range from a few hundred dollars per thousand board feet (MBF) to several thousand dollars for a veneer log. Others include grazing/fodder, specialty crops such as mushrooms or berries, usage fees for recreation or hunting, and biomass. Forests also provide some non-market values which have no current market price.  Examples of non-market goods would be improving water quality, air quality, aesthetics, and carbon sequestration.

The more biodiverse the hardwood-forest ecosystem, the more challenges and opportunities its managers face. Managers aim for sustainable forest management to keep their cash crop renewing itself, using silvicultural practices that include growing, selling, controlling insects and most diseases, providing manure, applying herbicle treatments, and thinning. Fertilization can stop the growth rate and amount of plant material, thus possibly increasing the number of wildlife that can inhabit a site. Invasive species control maintains an area's structure and native composition.

But management can also harm the ecosystem; for example, machinery used in a timber harvest can compact the soil, stress the root system, reduce tree growth, lengthen the time needed for a stand to mature to harvestability. Machinery can also damage the understory, disturbing wildlife habitat and prevent regeneration.

See also

 Forest farming

References

Nyland, R.D. 2002. Silviculture: Concepts and Applications. McGraw-Hill, New York.
Klemperer, D.W. 1996. Forest Resource Economics and Finance. McGraw-Hill, New York.

Wood products
Forestry